, also known as Fairy Princess Ren, is an anime OVA directed by Akitaro Daichi. It was released on VHS and DVD in North America by Media Blasters. The North American release contains a preview for a third OVA episode that was never produced; it's listed as an "evil preview."

Plot
Gou has vowed to find the legendary treasure of Salamander. Searching for it he meets Rane, a fairy, who is looking for the four treasures of Heart. Gou's childhood friend Mari is frustrated with Gou running after treasures, but befriends with another fairy Lean. Gou and Rane's treasure hunt messes with a secret project led by Mari's father. It turns out Salamander isn't what Gou thought it was in the first place...

Characters

Cast

Episodes

External links

 Review by ANN
 Review by T.H.E.M. Anime
 Review by Mania.com
 Review by The Anime Critic

1995 anime OVAs
Fantasy anime and manga